Monstruncusarctia decemmaculata is a moth of the family Erebidae. It was described by Rothschild in 1916. It is found in the Democratic Republic of Congo, Kenya, Tanzania and Uganda.

References

Spilosomina
Moths described in 1916